Darko Zorić (born 12 September 1993) is a Montenegrin professional footballer who plays as an attacking midfielder for Kazakh club Kyzylzhar and the national team of Montenegro.

Club career

Early career
Zorić made his professional debut with Sutjeska Nikšić in 2010 at the age of 17. After just playing seven games with Sutjeska, he transferred to city rivals Čelik Nikšić, with whom Zorić would reach two Montenegrin Cup finals. Throughout the winter of 2013–2014, negotiations took place between Zorić and Inter Milan and Red Star Belgrade.

AEK Athens
On 11 February 2014, it was announced that Zorić signed a contract with AEK Athens, but would play the rest of the 2013–14 season with Čelik before moving to AEK in July 2014. It was reported that Dušan Bajević tipped off the Greek club into recruiting Zorić. After almost three years with the club, he agreed to terminate his contract with AEK on 4 January 2017.

Loan to Borac Čačak
On 31 August 2015, Zorić joined Serbian side Borac Čačak on loan, coached by Nenad Lalatović at the time. On December 2, 2015, Zorić scored a hat-trick and made two assists in a 1-5 upset which eliminated heavily favored Red Star Belgrade in the second round of the 2015-16 Serbian Cup.

Čukarički
In early January 2017, Zorić signed a 2.5-year contract with Serbian team Čukarički, managed by his same coach from Borac Čačak, Nenad Lalatović. He made his debut for Čukarički on January 21, 2017, in a friendly match with BSK Borča which Čukarički won 9–0.<ref name="BlicDZ">{{cite web|url=http://sport.blic.rs/fudbal/domaci-fudbal/o-novom-klubu-darko-zoric-cuka-je-najsredeniji-klub-u-srbiji/2f7m09g|title=Blic: O NOVOM KLUBU Darko Zorić: Čuka je najsređeniji klub u Srbiji|language=Serbian|date=January 23, 2017|accessdate=August 25, 2017}}</ref> On February 1, 2019, Čukarički agreed with Zorić to terminate his contract.

Okzhetpes
On 4 February 2019, Zorić signed a one-year contract with Kazakh club FC Okzhetpes, with an option for a one-year extension.

International career
Zorić debuted at the age of 20 for the Montenegro national football team on May 23, 2014, in a 2–0 loss against Slovakia under coach Branko Brnović. He has, as of 20 October 2020, earned a total of 4 caps, scoring 1 goal.

International goalsScores and results list Montenegro's goal tally first.''

Honours
Čelik
Montenegrin Cup: 2011–12
AEK Athens
Football League: 2014-2015(South Group)

References

External links
 

1993 births
Living people
Footballers from Nikšić
Association football midfielders
Montenegrin footballers
Montenegro under-21 international footballers
Montenegro international footballers
FK Sutjeska Nikšić players
FK Čelik Nikšić players
AEK Athens F.C. players
FK Borac Čačak players
FK Čukarički players
FC Okzhetpes players
FC Kyzylzhar players
Montenegrin First League players
Montenegrin Second League players
Football League (Greece) players
Serbian SuperLiga players
Kazakhstan Premier League players
Montenegrin expatriate footballers
Expatriate footballers in Greece
Montenegrin expatriate sportspeople in Greece
Expatriate footballers in Serbia
Montenegrin expatriate sportspeople in Serbia
Expatriate footballers in Kazakhstan
Montenegrin expatriate sportspeople in Kazakhstan